Aulnoye-Aymeries is a commune in the Nord department in northern France. It was established in 1953 by the merger of the former communes Aulnoye and Aymeries.

Before the opening of the high-speed railway line between Brussels and Paris, the railway station of Aulnoye-Aymeries was a major junction, where the lines Paris–Brussels and Calais–Lille–Thionville connected.

Population
The population data given in the table and graph below for 1946 and earlier refer to the former commune of Aulnoye.

Twin towns
Aulnoye-Aymeries is twinned with:

  Quedlinburg, Germany, since 1961

See also
Communes of the Nord department

References

Communes of Nord (French department)